Rogers Avenue station is a Metro SubwayLink station in Baltimore, Maryland. It is located in the Woodmere area, and is the fifth most northern and western station on the line, with approximately 900 parking spaces.

Station layout

Station features

The station has been included in the MTA's 2021 digital signage pilot.

Artwork

The station features a sculpture entitled "Weathering Steel" by Greg Moring.

Nearby attractions
Baltimore City District Court
Hilltop Shopping Center
Jewish Community Center of Greater Baltimore
MTA Offices
Northwest Plaza
Pimlico Race Course

References

External links

 Rogers Avenue entrance from Google Maps Street View

Metro SubwayLink stations
Baltimore County, Maryland landmarks
Railway stations in the United States opened in 1983
1983 establishments in Maryland
Railway stations in Baltimore
Woodmere, Baltimore